Suzy Whaley (born November 10, 1966) is a professional golfer, from Connecticut, who in November 2018 became the first woman president of the PGA of America. In 2003, she became the first woman in 58 years to qualify for a PGA Tour event when she qualified for the 2003 Greater Hartford Open, after winning the 2002 Connecticut PGA Championship. She was also the first woman to win a PGA individual professional tournament. She is currently recognized by Golf for Women as a top 50 female instructor and is a board member and advisor for numerous organizations, including Golfer Girl Magazine. She is an LPGA Teaching and Club Professional (T&CP) member who played on the LPGA Tour in 1993.

Whaley's achievement is questioned by some because the regional qualifying tournament she won, the 2002 Connecticut PGA Championship, which gained her a place in the Greater Hartford Open, was aided by her being allowed to play the course off tees 699 yards shorter than the men she competed against in that regional qualifying: she played 6,239 yards, while the men had to play 6,938 yards (a 10% shorter course).

This anomaly was addressed later by the PGA, under the "Whaley rule", introduced in 2003, which requires all entrants at qualifying tournaments, whether male or female, to play off the same tees.

In 2014, Whaley became the first female officer in the PGA, as PGA secretary.

Personal
While at University of North Carolina she played on their golf team. ESPN described her in 2003 as "a 36-year-old club pro who played briefly on the LPGA tour." At the time, her mother was her caddie.

Both of her daughters and a niece play golf, and have participated in the Girls Junior PGA National Championships.

See also
Female golfers who have competed in men's PGA Tour tournaments:
Annika Sörenstam
Michelle Wie
Babe Didrikson Zaharias
Brittany Lincicome

References

American female golfers
LPGA Tour golfers
Golf administrators
Golfers from Connecticut
1966 births
Living people
21st-century American women